Lindy Booth (born April 2, 1979) is a Canadian actress. She played Riley Grant on the Disney Channel series The Famous Jett Jackson (and Agent Hawk in the show-within-a-show Silverstone) and Claudia on Relic Hunter and A.J. Butterfield on the NBC series The Philanthropist. She then played Cassandra  Cillian on the TNT series The Librarians (2014–2018).

Early life
Booth was born in Oakville, Ontario on April 2, 1979.

Career

Film
In 2001, Booth starred in the Canadian ensemble drama Century Hotel, and in 2002 she co-starred in the Canadian comedy film Rub & Tug. Booth starred as Dodger Allen in the 2005 movie Cry Wolf, appeared in the 2004 remake Dawn of the Dead as Nicole, and had a role in Wrong Turn with Eliza Dushku. In 2008, Booth starred in the thriller film Behind the Wall (originally titled The Wall).

Booth had a supporting role in the film Kick-Ass 2 (2013), playing Night Bitch.

Television
Booth starred in a number of television series earlier in her career. She contemporaneously played Riley Grant on the Disney Channel series The Famous Jett Jackson (and Agent Hawk in the show-within-a-show Silverstone) and its follow-up television movie Jett Jackson: The Movie, and Claudia on the syndicated television series Relic Hunter, from 1999–2001. She portrayed Lana Turner in the television film Life with Judy Garland: Me and My Shadows (2001).

Her other television credits include guest starring as different characters in two 2002 episodes of the A&E Network series A Nero Wolfe Mystery ("Before I Die" and "Poison à la Carte"), and a recurring role in season two of the USA Network series The 4400. She guest starred on such television shows as CSI: NY and Ghost Whisperer. She played Stephanie Goodison in the second episode of the Syfy television series Warehouse 13.

Originally cast in a recurring role, Booth was later promoted to a main role on the 2007–08 ABC drama, October Road, for the show's second season. In 2009, she played A.J. Butterfield on the short-lived NBC series The Philanthropist.

In 2013, Booth had a short recurring stint on the BBC America drama Copper. In 2014, Booth was cast in a starring role on the television series The Librarians, which aired on TNT.

Filmography

Film

Television

References

External links

 
 

1979 births
20th-century Canadian actresses
21st-century Canadian actresses
Actresses from Ontario
Canadian expatriate actresses in the United States
Canadian film actresses
Canadian television actresses
Living people
People from Oakville, Ontario